Mount Colbert is a mountain rising to ,  east of Mount Borcik and  south-southwest of Mount Stump in the southeast Hays Mountains, Queen Maud Mountains. It was named by the Advisory Committee on Antarctic Names in association with Mount Stump after Philip V. Colbert, geologist, Arizona State University, logistic coordinator and field associate with Edmund Stump on six United States Antarctic Research Program expeditions to the Transantarctic Mountains, 1970–71 through 1981–82, including the area of this mountain.

References 

Mountains of the Ross Dependency
Queen Maud Mountains
Amundsen Coast